Tazehabad-e Darreh Gerd (also Romanized as Tāzehābād-e Darreh Gerd; also known as Badreh Gerd-e Salīmī, Tāzehābād, and Tāzehābād-e Badr Gerd) is a village in Homeyl Rural District, Homeyl District, Eslamabad-e Gharb County, Kermanshah Province, Iran. At the 2006 census, its population was 237, in 46 families.

References 

Populated places in Eslamabad-e Gharb County